Ramakrishna is Sri Ramakrishna Paramahamsa, a Hindu religious teacher.

Ramakrishna may also refer to:

Ramakrishna (2004 Kannada film)
Ramakrishna (2004 Tamil film)
Ramakrishna (Kannada actor) (born 1954)
Ramakrishna (Telugu actor) (1939–2001)
Rama Krishna Puram, an area of south Delhi
Ramakrishna Studios, an Indian film production house
V. Ramakrishna Polytechnic, a college in North Chennai
Ramakrishna Math, a religious order
Ramakrishna Temple
Ramakrishna Mission
Ramakrishna Sevashram Chittagong
Sri Ramakrishna Engg College
Sri Sri Ramakrishna Kathamrita, a Bengali five-volume work about the teachings of Ramakrishna

People with the name
Bhanumathi Ramakrishna (1925–2005), Indian actress
Tenali Ramakrishna (Garlapati Tenali Ramakrishna, Tenali Rama, Vikata Kavi), court poet and jester
Velagapudi Ramakrishna (1896–1968), Indian civil servant and industrialist
V. Ramakrishna (1947–2015), Telugu playback singer
Nataraja Ramakrishna (1933–2011), Kuchipudi dance guru from Andhra Pradesh
Swadeshabhimani Ramakrishna Pillai (1878–1916), Indian writer, journalist, newspaper editor, and political activist
Kodi Ramakrishna, Indian movie director and writer
Burgula Ramakrishna Rao (1899–1967), Indian politician
Koneru Ramakrishna Rao (born 1932), Indian philosopher, psychologist, parapsychologist, educationist, teacher, researcher and administrator
P. S. Ramakrishna Rao (1918–1986), Indian Telugu film director
Pratani Ramakrishna Goud, Indian Telugu film producer, director, screen play writer and distributor
A. L. Ramakrishna Naicker, Indian politician
K. R. Ramanathan (Kalpathi Ramakrishna Ramanathan, 1893–1984), Indian physicist and meteorologist
Bob Rau (Bantwal Ramakrishna Rau, 1951–2002), Indian computer engineer
A. R. Krishnashastry (Ambale Ramakrishna Krishnasastry, 1890–1968), Indian Kannada writer, researcher and translator
Kadammanitta Ramakrishnan (M. R. Ramakrishna Panikkar, 1935–2008), Indian poet
Ramakrishna Badiga (born 1942), Indian politician
Ramakrishna Gopal Bhandarkar, Indian scholar and social reformer
Ramakrishna Hegde (1926–2004), Indian politician
Ramakrishna Ranga Rao of Bobbili (1901–1978), Indian politician
Bhau Daji (Ramakrishna Vitthal Laud, 1822–1874), Indian physician and scholar
Tanguturi Anjaiah (Ramakrishna Reddi Talla, 1919–1986), Indian politician
R. B. Naik (Ramakrishna Beeranna Naik, 1904–1970), Indian politician

See also
Ramakrishna Mission Vidyalaya (disambiguation)
Ramakrishna Mission Vidyapith (disambiguation)